Pleurodonte dentiens is a species of  tropical air-breathing land snail, a pulmonate gastropod mollusk in the family Pleurodontidae.

Distribution 
The distribution of Pleurodonte dentiens includes:
 Guadeloupe
 Dominica
 Martinique

Ecology 
This species is widespread on the Dominica, especially in disturbed habitats and agricultural areas. It is suspected to cause feeding damage to various crops.

References
This article incorporates CC-BY-3.0 text from the reference 

Pleurodontidae
Gastropods described in 1822